Kharmohre is a kind of ceramic artwork with bright turquoise blue color which is also called kuji or bead of mehr. The Qom state of Iran is the only producer of kharmohre in the world. The color of kharmohre is also known as Iranian blue. It is registered as Turquoise pearl of the ancient Persia in Expo 2000 Hanover, Germany. This art is traced back at least to 6000 years ago at copper furnaces around Qom in Iran. This art is introduced as "Qom Technique" at New York museum book.

Kharmohre is one of souvenirs of Qom and its main application is for decoration.

References 

Iranian pottery